La reina de Franklin (lit. The Queen of Franklin) is a Chilean telenovela produced by AGTV Producciones and Grupo Secuoya and broadcast by Canal 13 from November 19, 2018 to May 2, 2019.

Cast

Main cast 
 Javiera Contador as Yolanda "Yoli" Garrido
 Claudia Di Girolamo as Julia Tocornal
 Francisco Pérez-Bannen as Franklin "Frank" Ulloa
 Mónica Godoy as Camila Ossa
 Daniel Alcaíno as Arturo Marabolí
 Susana Hidalgo as Diana Poblete
 Nicolás Poblete as Eduardo "Lalo" Marabolí
 Felipe Contreras as Bruno "Moái" Silva
 Catalina Guerra as Magnolia Jorquera

Supporting cast 
 Jaime Omeñaca as Eusebio Rojas
 Josefina Velasco as Berta Fernández
 María Elena Duvauchelle as Violeta Palacios
 Carolina Arredondo as María Conchita Canales
 Nicolás Brown as Joel Valderrama
 Catalina Castelblanco as Estefanía "Steffy" Poblete
 Ariel Mateluna as Alberto "Tato" Tobar
 Belén Soto as Valentina Ulloa
 Francisco Dañobeitía as Cristóbal Ulloa
 Vivianne Dietz as Lourdes Rojas
 Josefina Nast as Grace Poblete
 Rafael de la Reguera as David Rojas
 Steevens Benjamin as Cedric Eche
 Rodrigo Vásquez as El "Fostorito"

Special participation 
 Sergio Hernández as Elías Garrido
 Malucha Pinto as Victoria Hidalgo
 Teresa Münchmeyer as Teresita Herrera
 Gustavo Becerra as Becerra, Mayor de Carabineros

References

External links 
  
 

2018 Chilean television series debuts
2019 Chilean television series endings
2018 telenovelas
Chilean telenovelas
Canal 13 (Chilean TV channel) telenovelas
Spanish-language telenovelas
Television shows set in Santiago